Mauricio Salvador Segovia Piffaut, (born December 30, 1977) is a Chilean former football (soccer) defender.

He last played for San Marcos de Arica. He spent nine seasons in the Chilean First Division and two with the Puerto Rico Islanders of USL-1 before transferring to the RailHawks in 2008.

Club career
Segovia began his career as a youth player with Universidad Católica in 1994. In 1997, he moved up to the first team and remained with it until he transferred to Unión Española in 1999. He then spent a single season with them and another single season with Antofagasta in 2000–2001.

He was back at Universidad Católica in 2001 and remained until 2004 when he moved to Palestino. In 2006, he left Chile to sign with the Puerto Rico Islanders of the USL First Division. He was the 2006 USL-1 Defender of the Year and a first team All Star.  In 2008, he moved to the Carolina RailHawks. In 2009, he moved to Provincial Osorno in the second division from Chile

Coaching career
Following his retirement as a football player, Segovia began coaching at the Magallanes at the under-17 level from 2014 to 2015. Next. He has worked as an assistant coach for several clubs in Chile. On 12 September 2021, he coached Deportes Valdivia as a caretaker after Luis Marcoleta, the head coach, couldn't make it.

Honours

Club
Universidad Católica
 Primera División de Chile (2): 1997 Apertura, 2002 Apertura

Unión Española
 Primera B (1): 1999

San Marcos de Arica
 Primera B (1): 2012

References

External links
 
 
 Mauricio Segovia at playmakerstats.com (English version of ceroacero.es)
 Carolina RailHawks Player Profile

1977 births
Living people
People from Punta Arenas
Chilean footballers
Club Deportivo Universidad Católica footballers
Unión Española footballers
C.D. Antofagasta footballers
Club Deportivo Palestino footballers
Puerto Rico Islanders players
North Carolina FC players
Provincial Osorno footballers
Curicó Unido footballers
Puerto Montt footballers
San Marcos de Arica footballers
Deportes Magallanes footballers
Magallanes footballers
Chilean Primera División players
Primera B de Chile players
USL First Division players
Chilean expatriate footballers
Chilean expatriate sportspeople in Puerto Rico
Chilean expatriate sportspeople in the United States
Expatriate footballers in Puerto Rico
Expatriate soccer players in the United States
Association football defenders
Chilean football managers
Deportes Valdivia managers
Segunda División Profesional de Chile managers